The 1913 Victorian soccer season was the fifth competitive season of soccer in the Australian state of Victoria, under association with the governing body of Football Victoria. The season consisted of two leagues, being 'Victorian Division 1' and 'Victorian Division 2'. The calendar season also saw the fourth tournament of the Dockerty Cup, in which Yarraville FC were crowned winners are defeating St Kilda 4–3 in the grand final.

Overview
At the conclusion of the 1912 season in division 1, newly formed club Footscray and inaugural club Carlton United both folded, leaving the division 1 with only seven teams after the planned relegation of the last two teams on the ladder being Fitzroy and Sunshine to the newly formed division 2. Footscray Thistle had been established sometime between late 1912 & early 1913 and were promoted directly into division 1, bypassing the newly formed division 2. The new division 2 was to consist of six clubs, four of which were to debut in the Victorian state league system plus the two relegated division 1 clubs. These four new clubs consisted of Hawthorn, Moorabbin, Preston and Spotswood. The top two finishing teams played off in a grand final to determine the league champions, whilst division 1 did not contest a finals series.

League Tables

Division 1

Division 2

References

Soccer in Victoria (Australia)
1913 in Australian soccer